Edinburgh is the capital city of Scotland.

Edinburgh may also refer to:

 Edinburgh Airport
 University of Edinburgh
 Edinburgh Agreement (1992), a political compromise reached to accommodate Denmark's objections to the Maastricht Treaty
 Edinburgh Agreement (2012), an agreement over the terms of the 2014 referendum on Scottish independence
 Edinburgh (novel), a novel by author Alexander Chee
 Edinburgh: Picturesque Notes, a 1878 travel book by Robert Louis Stevenson
 Livingston (basketball), a now defunct Scottish basketball team, named Edinburgh in 1977–1987
 County of Edinburgh, the formal name of Midlothian until 1890

People 
 Duke of Edinburgh
 Justin Edinburgh (1969–2019), English footballer

Places

Australia
 Edinburgh, South Australia
 RAAF Base Edinburgh

Canada
 Edinburgh Island, Nunavut, Canada
 New Edinburgh, Nova Scotia
 New Edinburgh, Ontario

New Zealand
 Dunedin, Otago, named after Edinburgh using the Gaelic name

South Africa
 Edinburgh, Mpumalanga

United States
 Edinburgh, Indiana
 Edinburgh, the original name of Titusville, Pennsylvania 
 Edinboro, Pennsylvania
 Edinboro University of Pennsylvania
 Edinburg, New Jersey
 Edinburgh, Ohio
 Edinburg, Texas
 Edinburg, Virginia

Places-Miscellaneous
 Edinburgh of the Seven Seas, main settlement of Tristan da Cunha in the South Atlantic
 Edinburgh Hill, point in Livingston Island, South Shetland Islands
 Edinburgh Peak, highest summit of Gough Island

Ships 
 HMS Edinburgh, six ships with this name

See also 
 Dunedin (disambiguation)
 Edinburgh Place, Hong Kong
 Edinburgh Square, Caledonia, Ontario, Canada
Edithburgh
 Edinburg (disambiguation)
 Edinboro (disambiguation)
 New Edinburgh (disambiguation)